The Andean poison frog (Andinobates opisthomelas) is a species of frog in the family Dendrobatidae. It is endemic to Colombia. Its natural habitat is subtropical or tropical moist montane forests. It is threatened by habitat loss.

References

Sources
 Ramírez Pinilla, M.P., Osorno-Muñoz, M., Rueda, J.V., Amézquita, A. & Ardila-Robayo, M.C. 2004. Ranitomeya opisthomelas. 2006 IUCN Red List of Threatened Species.  Downloaded on 21 July 2007.

Andinobates
Amphibians of Colombia
Amphibians of the Andes
Amphibians described in 1899
Endemic fauna of Colombia
Taxonomy articles created by Polbot